The following elections occurred in the year 1974.

Africa
 1974 Botswana general election
 1974 Guinean general election
 1974 Kenyan general election
 1974 Rhodesian general election
 1974 Seychellois parliamentary election
 1974 South African general election
 1974 South West African legislative election

Asia

 1974 Bangladeshi presidential election
 1974 Burmese general election
 1974 Japanese House of Councillors election
 1974 Maldivian parliamentary election
 1974 Sikkimese general election
 1974 Singaporean presidential election

India
 1974 Indian presidential election

Malaysia
 1974 Malaysian general election
 1974 Malaysian state elections
 1974 Sarawak state election

Australia
 1974 Australian federal election
 1974 Goyder state by-election
 1974 Northern Territory general election
 1974 Australian referendum
 1974 Western Australian state election

Europe
 1974 Albanian parliamentary election
 1974 Austrian presidential election
 1974 Belgian general election
 1974 Greek legislative election
 1974 Icelandic parliamentary election
 1974 Irish presidential election
 1974 Italian divorce referendum
 1974 Luxembourgian legislative election

France
 1974 French presidential election

United Kingdom
 February 1974 United Kingdom general election
 October 1974 United Kingdom general election
 List of MPs elected in the February 1974 United Kingdom general election
 List of MPs elected in the October 1974 United Kingdom general election
 1974 Newham South by-election

United Kingdom local
 1974 United Kingdom local elections

English local
 1974 Lambeth Council election
 1974 Lewisham Council election
 1974 Newham Council election
 1974 Southwark Council election

North America
 1974 Belizean legislative election
 1974 Guatemalan general election
 1974 Nicaraguan general election
 1974 Salvadoran legislative election

Canada
 1974 Canadian federal election
 1974 Brantford municipal election
 1974 Edmonton municipal election
 1974 New Brunswick general election
 1974 Nova Scotia general election
 1974 Ottawa municipal election
 1974 Prince Edward Island general election
 1974 Toronto municipal election
 1974 Winnipeg municipal election
 1974 Yukon general election

United States
 1974 United States Senate elections
 1974 United States elections
 1974 United States gubernatorial elections

United States mayoral
 1974 Washington, D.C. mayoral election

United States gubernatorial
 1974 California gubernatorial election
 1974 Maine gubernatorial election
 1974 Massachusetts gubernatorial election
 1974 Minnesota gubernatorial election
 1974 Oregon gubernatorial election
 1974 South Carolina gubernatorial election
 1974 United States gubernatorial elections

California
 1974 California gubernatorial election

Colorado

Maine
 1974 Maine gubernatorial election

Massachusetts
 1974 Massachusetts gubernatorial election

Minnesota
 1974 Minnesota gubernatorial election

New Hampshire
 United States Senate election in New Hampshire, 1974

New York
 1974 New York state election

Oklahoma
 United States Senate election in Oklahoma, 1974

Oregon
 1974 Oregon gubernatorial election
 United States Senate election in Oregon, 1974

South Carolina
 1974 South Carolina gubernatorial election

United States House of Representatives
 1974 United States House of Representatives elections
 United States House of Representatives elections in California, 1974
 1974 Georgia's 6th congressional district election
 United States House of Representatives elections in South Carolina, 1974

United States Senate
 1974 United States Senate elections
 1974 New York state election
 United States Senate election in North Carolina, 1974
 United States Senate election in North Dakota, 1974
 United States Senate election in Ohio, 1974
 United States Senate election in Oklahoma, 1974
 United States Senate election in Oregon, 1974
 United States Senate election in South Carolina, 1974
 United States Senate election in New Hampshire, 1974

Washington, D.C.
 1974 Washington, D.C. mayoral election

South America

Brazil 

 1974 Brazilian legislative election
 1974 Brazilian presidential election

Colombia  
 1974 Colombian general election

Oceania
 1974 Cook Islands general election

Australia
 1974 Australian federal election
 1974 Goyder state by-election
 1974 Northern Territory general election
 1974 Australian referendum
 1974 Western Australian state election

 
1974
Elections